D'Youville Academy is a historic school building and nunnery in Plattsburgh in Clinton County, New York. It was built about 1878 and is a -story, cruciform plan brick structure on a raised stone foundation. The facade features a rounded 2-story bay, a five-gable roof dormer, and Mansard roof. The Academy was founded about 1878 and operated by the Grey Nuns, founded by Saint Marie-Marguerite d'Youville (1701-1771). The Academy has since been folded into the Seton Catholic Central High School, and the building has since been converted into apartments.

It was listed on the National Register of Historic Places in 1982.

References

School buildings on the National Register of Historic Places in New York (state)
School buildings completed in 1878
Buildings and structures in Clinton County, New York
National Register of Historic Places in Clinton County, New York
1878 establishments in New York (state)